Armillaria montagnei is a species of agaric fungus in the family Physalacriaceae. This species is found in Australia, Europe, New Zealand, and South America.

See also 
 List of Armillaria species

References 

montagnei
Fungal tree pathogens and diseases
Fungi described in 1956
Fungi of Australia
Fungi of Europe
Fungi of New Zealand
Fungi of South America
Taxa named by Rolf Singer